Bharat Ka Veer Putra – Maharana Pratap is an Indian historical fiction series produced by Contiloe Entertainment. It is based on the life of Maharana Pratap, a sixteenth century ruler of Mewar kingdom. It starred Sharad Malhotra, Rachana Parulkar, Faisal Khan and Roshni Walia in lead roles.

The series premiered on 27 May 2013. Amitabh Bachchan narrated the introductory part of the series in first episode tracing the background of Mewar family and their resistance to Foreign Invasions. 

The series received positive reviews and won numerous awards and nominations. The final episode of the series aired on 10 December 2015.

Cast

Main
 Sharad Malhotra as Maharana Pratap - Udai Singh and Jaivanta Bai's son; Maharani Ajabde bai Punwar and Phool Bai Rathore's husband; Amar Singh's father
 Faisal Khan as young Maharana Pratap
 Rachana Parulkar as Maharani Ajabde Punwar - Rao Mamrakh Punwar and Hansa Bai's daughter; Pratap's first and only loved wife. His only chief consort; Amar Singh's mother 
 Roshni Walia as young Ajabde Punwar
 Krip Suri/Avinesh Rekhi as Akbar - Ruqaiya Sultan, Salima Sultan and Harka bai's husband
 Sahil Deshmukh Khan / Arish Bhiwandiwala / Vishal Jethwa as young Akbar
 Shakti Anand as Rana Udai Singh II - Jaivanta Bai, Dheer Bai, Sajja Bai and Veer Bai's husband; Pratap, Shakti, Vikram, Jagmal, Chand and Maan's father
 Rajshree Thakur as Maharani Jaivanta Bai Songara - Udai Singh's first wife and chief consort; Pratap's mother
 Heena Parmar as Rani Phool Bai Rathore - Ramchandra Rathore's daughter; Pratap's fifth wife (political alliance with Marwar); Amar Singh's step-mother
 Jannat Zubair Rahmani as young Phool Bai Rathore
 Aashka Goradia as Rani Dheer Bai Bhatiyani - Udai Singh's fifth and favourite wife; Jagmal, Chand and Maan's mother 
 Jineet Rath  as Maharana Amar Singh I - Pratap and Ajabde's son; Udai Singh and Jaivanta Bai's grandson. Crown prince and later Maharana of Mewar.

Recurring
 Divyaalakshmi as Rani Sajjabai Solankini - Udai Singh's second wife; Shakti and Vikramdev's mother
 Khuram Khan as Jagmal Singh - Udai Singh and Dheer Bai's son; Pratap's step-brother
 Vineet Kumar as Shakti Singh - Udai Singh and Sajjabai's son; Vikramdev's brother; Pratap's step-brother
Dhruv Sangwan as Young Shakti Singh
 Sareeka Dhillon as Rani Veerbai Jhala - Udai Singh's junior wife. Pratap's stepmother 
 Yash Mistry as Vikramdev Singh - Udai Singh and Sajjabai's son; Shakti's brother; Pratap's step-brother
 Vaishali Takkar / Vinita Mahesh as Rajkumari Maan Kanwar - Udai Singh and Dheer Bai's daughter; Pratap's step-sister
 Deeksha K Sonalkar as Rajkumari Chaand Kanwar - Udai Singh and Dheer Bai's daughter; Pratap's step-sister
 Tunisha Sharma as young Chaand Kanwar
 Bakul Thakkar as Rao Mamrakh Punwar - Governor of Bijolia; Rani Hansa Bai's husband; Maharani Ajabde's father and Maharana Pratap's father-in-law
 Anjali Rana as Rani Hansa Bai - Rao Mamrakh Punwar's wife; Maharani Ajabde's mother and Maharana Pratap's mother-in-law.
 Rajeev Bhardwaj as Rawat Sai Das Chundawat - Udai Singh and Mewar's chief
 Shaize Kazmi as Rawat Krishna Das Chundawat - Udai Singh and Mewar's chief
 Ankur Nayyar as Acharya Raghvendra; Mewar's Guru
 Nirbhay Wadhwa as Hakim Khan Sur - Pratap's soldier in Battle of Haldighati
 Tasha Kapoor as  Harka bai - Princess of Amer. Akbar's wife and third empress consort
 Falaq Naaz as Ruqaiya Sultan Begum - Princess of Munghal empire. Akbar's cousin and first wife and chief consort. 
 Riya Deepsi as Salima Sultan Begum - Princess of Mughal Empire. Akbar's cousin and second chief consort; Bairam Khan's former wife.
 Muskaan Nancy James as Meera Bai - Bhoj Raj's wife; Pratap's aunt; Udai Singh's Sister-in-law; Krishna devotee
 Shailesh Datar as Tulsidas - Rama's devotee
 Ankit Bhardwaj as Rao Chandrasen Rathore - Maldeo Rathore's son; Phool Bai's uncle
 Surendra Pal as Rao Maldeo Rathore - Phool Bai's grandfather; King of Marwar
 Jaya Bhattacharya as Maham Anga - Akbar's foster mother. Daughter of Babur from his consort Bibi Mubarika Begum
 Shahbaz Khan (actor) as Bairam Khan - Akbar's guardian; Salima Sultan's first husband 
 Anand Goradia as Rao Surjan Singh - Governor of Ranthambore
 Kanha Shashikant Sharma as Mansingh, Duda and Bheem - Akbar's army commander and Navratnas; Jodha Bai's nephew
 Rushiraj Pawar as Patta Sisodia - Ajabde's sworn brother; Mewar's army commander
 Ved Thappar  as Rao Jaimal - Mewar's army commander
 Yash Karia / Triyug Mantri as Pandit Chakrapani Mishra - Pratap's Court pandit and scientist
 Mrinal Deshraj as Rani Uma Bhatiyani - Maldeo Rathore's wife; Dheer Bai's sister
 Hemant Choudhary as Dondiya Thakur Sanda - Udai Singh's army commander 
 Piyush Sharma as Jhala Mann Singh - Pratap's commander in Battle of Haldighati
 Manoj Verma as Bhil Rana Kheta Ji/Rana Punja Ji - Pratap's commander in Battle of Haldighati
 Vindhya Tiwari  as Rani Durgavati - Dalpat Shah's wife and regent of Gondwana
 Raju Shrestha as Mia Tansen - Akbar's Navaratnas
 Neha Bam as Dai Kokoi - Dheer Bai's maid
 Sharhaan Singh as Ismail Khan
 Dakssh Ajit Singh as Raj Rana Bahadur
 Pradeep Kabra as Shams Khan
 Siraj Mustafa Khan as Basar Khan
 Anjali Priya as Krishna
 Akhil Vaid as Baadshah Khan
 Reema Vohra as Gauhar Jaan
 Pratibha Paul as Khetu
 Kunal Bakshi as Peer Mohammad
 Tarun Khanna as Zahir Saaka
 Ritesh M M Shukla as Takkal Pandit
 Javed Pathan as Husain Ali Quli Khan - Akbar's Soldier in Siege Of Chittor
 Manish Bishla as Aalim khan - Akbar's Soldier in Siege Of Chittor
 Rohit Tailor as Khurasen

Cameo appearance
 Aarav Chowdhary as Rana Sanga - Udai Singh's father; Pratap's grandfather
 Gufi Paintal  as  Humayun - Akbar's father
 Priya Marathe as Saubhagyawati 
 Amit Singh as soldier of Rao Surjan Singh

Awards and nominations

Indian Television Academy Awards

Indian Telly Awards

Gold Awards

BIG Star Entertainment Awards

Lions Gold Awards

References

External links
 

Sony Entertainment Television original programming
Indian period television series
Indian historical television series
Memorials to Maharana Pratap
2013 Indian television series debuts
Television shows set in Rajasthan
2015 Indian television series endings
Cultural depictions of Akbar
Television series set in the 16th century